The Mosque of the Companions is a mosque in the city of Massawa, Eritrea. Dating to the early 7th century C.E., it is believed to be the first mosque in Africa.

History 

It was reportedly built by companions of the Islamic Prophet Muhammad who travelled to Africa to flee persecution by people in the Hejazi city of Mecca, present-day Saudi Arabia. The current structure is of much later construction, as some features like the mihrab (late 7th century) and the minaret (9th century) did not develop until later in Islamic architecture.

See also 
 Afro-Arabs
 List of mosques
 Al-Masjid al-Haram in Mecca
 List of mosques in Africa
 Al Nejashi Mosque, Ethiopia
 Lists of mosques
 Quba Mosque, Medina

References

External links 

Massawa
Mosques in Eritrea
Mosques completed in 610
7th-century mosques